Jorge Nunes Sampaio (born 19 May 1998) known as Jorginho, is a Portuguese professional footballer who plays for Fafe as a defender.

Club career
On 22 October 2017, Sampaio made his professional debut with Vitória Guimarães B in a 2017–18 LigaPro match against Santa Clara.

References

External links

1998 births
Living people
Sportspeople from Guimarães
Portuguese footballers
Association football defenders
Liga Portugal 2 players
Campeonato de Portugal (league) players
Vitória S.C. B players
AD Fafe players